Nahid is the Persian name for the Iranian goddess Anahita.

Nahid (film), 2015 Iranian film
Nahid (magazine), Ottoman magazine
Nahid-1, Iranian satellite
The mother of Iskandar (Alexander the Great) in Persian literature

People with the given name
Nahid Afrin (born 2001), Indian singer
Nahid Bhadelia, American physician
Nahid Kulenović (1929–1969), Croatian politician
Nahid Hasan (born 1988), Indian politician
Nahid al-Rayyis (1937–2010), Palestinian politician
Nahid Angha (born 1945), American Sufi scholar
Nahid Toubia (born 1951), Sudanese surgeon and women's health rights activist
Nahid Shahmehri (born 1952), Swedish professor of Computer Science
Nahid Persson Sarvestani (born 1960), Swedish filmmaker
Nahid Majid, (born 1964) British civil servant

People with the surname
Nurul Islam Nahid (born 1945), Bangladeshi politician

See also
Anahita (disambiguation)
Nahida (disambiguation)